Allepipona is an Afrotropical genus of potter wasps.

Species
The following species are included in the genus Allepipona:

 Allepipona erythrospila (Cameron, 1905) - Lesotho, South Africa and Zimbabwe
 Allepipona erythrura Giordani Soika, 1987 - Namibia
 Allepipona perspicax Giordani Soika, 1987 Democratic Republic of Congo, South Africa and Zimbabwe
 Allepipona schultzeana (von Schulthess, 1914) - (Namibia, South Africa)
 Allepipona emortualis (Saussure, 1853) - Ethiopia, Lesotho, Somalia, South Africa, Tanzania and  Zimbabwe.
 Allepipona similis Gusenleitner, 2000 - Kenya and  Tanzania
 Allepipona splendida Gusenleitner, 1997  - South Africa

References

Biological pest control wasps
Potter wasps